Ralph Verney may refer to:

Sir Ralph Verney, 1st Baronet, of Middle Claydon (1613–1696), English MP for Aylesbury and for Buckingham
Ralph Verney, 1st Earl Verney (1683–1752), English MP for Amersham and for Wendover 1741–1753
Ralph Verney, 2nd Earl Verney (1714–1791), his son, English MP for Wendover 1753–1761, Carmarthen and for Buckinghamshire
Sir Ralph Verney, 1st Baronet, of Eaton Square (1879–1959), Secretary to the Viceroy of India and the Speaker of the House of Commons
Sir Ralph Verney, 5th Baronet (1915–2001), British Army officer, local politician and landowner